The following is a list of notable Italian-American television characters.

To be included in this list, the character should be a main or frequently recurring character in a television series, and should have an article or section in Wikipedia. The character should be described as Italian-American in the text or categories.

Others
The following characters are presumably (but not verifiably) meant to be Italian-American.

See also

 Vito Scotti - Italian-American character actor who frequently appeared on TV. 
 List of Italian-American actors
 Growing Up Gotti
 Jersey Shore
 Mob Wives

References

Italian-American